Basic Education High School (BEHS) No. 2 Mandalay (formerly, Mandalay National High School) is a public high school in Mandalay, Myanmar. It was formerly called Mandalay National High School.

Notable alumni and faculty
 U Razak, headmaster of Mandalay National High School
 Ludu Daw Amar
 Kyar Ba Nyein
 Vice-Senior General Maung Aye. Vice-Chairman of the State Peace and Development Council (SPDC), the ruling military junta of Burma.
 M.A. Ma Ohn matriculated in 1930 from the  Central National High School Mandalay, Professor of Pali in Mandalay University 
 Dr Kaung Zan (Chief Agricultural research Officer of Burma later International Rice Research Institute of Philippines)  
 Colonel Khin Nyo (Ne Win's Caretaker Government in 1957 and Revolution Council Member in 1962) 
 Saw Hla. President of the Students’ Union of this school during the all Burma General Strike in 1938. Patron of the old student association of this school.
 Thakin Chan Tun. Revolutionist, awarded First Prize of Nainggan Gonyi.
 Thuriya Than Maung, President of the Rangoon University Student Union and All Burma Student Union.  Journalist.
 Maung Maung Mya, President of the Malun Rice Cherity Association Mandalay 
 Theikpan Hmu Tin Ret. Major, journalist. Award from WHO for his writing against smoking.

References

External links 
Dr Nyi Nyi, BSC (Hons) Ph D (London) D.I.C. 1st. Edition July 2007. OS Printing House Co Ltd. Bangkok, "U Razak of Burma, a Teacher, a Leader, a Martyr",  Although the book is about U Razak, most of the facts are about Mandalay National High School, as he was the Head Master and all the short articles were written by his former students.

High schools in Mandalay